Anthony James Lucca (born January 23, 1976) is an American singer, songwriter, record producer, and actor. He is perhaps best known for starting his career on  The Mickey Mouse Club. After the Mickey Mouse Club, Lucca went to Los Angeles, California, for a brief career as an actor, then became a full-time musician.  He is a consistent touring artist and has toured with a multitude of acts, including Maroon 5, Kelly Clarkson, *NSYNC, Marc Anthony, Josh Hoge, Sara Bareilles, Matt Duke, Tyrone Wells, and the late Chris Whitley. He finished in third place on the second season (2012) of the American reality television singing competition talent show, The Voice, broadcast on NBC.

Early life
Lucca was born in Pontiac, Michigan, the son of Sally and Tony Lucca. Lucca is of Italian, Welsh, French, and English descent. Lucca grew up around a large and musical extended family, as his mother Sally was tenth of twelve children of the Detroit jazz piano player James "Jimmy" Stevenson. Lucca grew up in Waterford, Michigan, and began singing at age 3 and child modeling at age 9. When he was 12, he began playing in Detroit-area bands with his cousin, Cole Garlak.

Professional and musical career

Early career 
When Lucca was 14, he went to Detroit to audition for the Disney movie Newsies, only to find out the audition was for The Mickey Mouse Club instead. Encouraged by his sister, he auditioned for the show and was picked for callbacks in Los Angeles. In Los Angeles, he was selected along with 8 other kids to join the cast for the fourth season of the show. Lucca moved to Orlando, Florida, with his mother and lived in an apartment complex with other castmates and traveled back to Michigan between seasons. He remained with the show for four seasons, until being let go during the seventh season when the show was canceled.

In 1995, after the cancellation of the Mickey Mouse Club, Lucca moved to Los Angeles to begin an acting career. He lived with fellow Mickey Mouse Club castmate Keri Russell, his girlfriend at the time. Russell and Lucca were cast and played leads together on the Aaron Spelling-produced Malibu Shores, a television teen drama series, which lasted for one season.  During this time he filmed commercials for Levi Jeans, J.C. Penney, and Blockbuster Video. He had minor success in movies, appearing in an NBC movie of the week, Her Last Chance with Kellie Martin and Jonathan Brandis, as well as two independent features. He left acting in 1997 to pursue music.

In 1997, Lucca self-released his first music album, So Satisfied, which he also co-produced. In 1998, he launched his website www.tonylucca.com and began to sell his debut CD and its self-released follow-up, Strong Words Softly Spoken through the website and at live shows he later released two EPs and a limited series of Live & Limited CDs through his site; each CD sold was numbered and signed. In 2001 and 2002, he served as opening act for boy band NSYNC, which featured fellow Mickey Mouse Club co-stars Justin Timberlake and JC Chasez.

Lucca's third full-length album and his first commercially distributed, Shotgun, was released in 2004 in conjunction with Lightyear and New Vibe Records; the album was executive co-produced by JC Chasez, who Lucca toured with to support the album. 2006 saw the release of Canyon Songs, recorded in both Laurel and Beachwood Canyons, and Live in Hollywood, a live concert album; both albums were distributed by Rock Ridge Music.  Come Around Again was released in 2008.

Lucca participated in a cooperative tour with Jay Nash and Matt Duke, which resulted in the 2009 EP entitled TFDI.  The collaboration, which stands for "Totally Fuckin' Doing It" was recorded in the Evanston, Illinois, studio SPACE during an impromptu visit to the studio, after the three artists formed a friendship during the tour. Lucca briefly returned to acting in 2010, starring in a 901 Silver Tequila commercial, which was directed by the brand's founder Justin Timberlake. He also played himself on an episode of Parenthood, appearing as a performing musician. Lucca's sixth album was released in 2010, entitled Rendezvous With the Angels, on Rock Ridge Music. Solo, an acoustic CD composed of b-sides and previously unreleased recordings was released in November 2010, and given away for free in conjunction with Amazon.com's MP3 web store. Lucca recorded a second collaborative CD with Jay Nash and Matt Duke, TFDI II, which was released mid-2011.

The Voice and 222 Records (2012–2018) 
On February 5, 2012, Tony appeared on the Blind Auditions of the American reality talent show The Voice in its second season. He performed Ray LaMontagne's "Trouble", and all four judges hit their red "I Want You" button for him. He chose to join Adam Levine's team. It was also in this show he reunited with fellow Mouseketeer Christina Aguilera. He advanced to the semi-finals, which he performed "How You Like Me Now" by The Heavy and moved on to the final round. For the final round on May 7, he performed Hugo's country-styled version of the Jay-Z song, "99 Problems". On May 8, 2012, Lucca made his last performance on the show duetting with fellow contestant Jordis Unga formerly of Team Blake on the Fleetwood Mac song, "Go Your Own Way". Later that night, it was announced he had placed third in the competition, barely placing ahead of Mann by one quarter of a percentage point and coming behind winner Jermaine Paul from Team Blake and first runner-up Juliet Simms from Team Cee Lo. Lucca was later signed to Adam Levine's record label, 222 Records.

Lucca released a six-song EP, With The Whole World Watching, on July 16, 2013. Lucca toured extensively following the release, including six dates on the Honda Civic Tour opening for Kelly Clarkson and Maroon 5.

Lucca joined Patreon in 2013. On November 12, 2013, while plugging Patreon on his YouTube channel, Tony announced he is no longer with Adam Levine's record label 222 Records.  Excerpt: "Some of you know that recently I was signed to a fairly high profile record deal.  -Super cool.  What most of you don't know is that, said "record deal", has since come to an end.  -Not as cool. Your basic record business 101 really..."

Tony Lucca then moved to Nashville, Tennessee to further develop his songwriting. He funded his 2015 album Tony Lucca via crowd-funding platform Kickstarter, also releasing a corresponding collection of songs called Made To Shine – The Kickstarter Sessions. Lucca would later share that the 2015 album took a personal toll on him, like "going through a really bad breakup," and told Billboard that after the record he "was in no hurry to get back in the studio" but instead elected to co-write as many songs as he could with Nashville collaborators.

In 2018, Lucca partnered with Nashville startup company RootNote and began work on his new record Ain't No Storm, which he recorded with Nashville-based producer and former Wilco drummer Ken Coomer. He released the first single and music video, "Everything's Changing," in November 2018. At the end of 2018, he signed a publishing deal with Demolition Music.

Ain't No Storm (2019–present) 
Tony Lucca independently released Ain't No Storm on March 29, 2019. The album received critical acclaim, with PopMatters calling it an "expanding of his musical boundaries" and likening Lucca to contemporaries Amos Lee, Jason Isbell, and Ben Schneider. Others called it "one helluva record," "highly crafted songwriting," and "more inspired than ever."

Other ventures
Many of Lucca's songs have been featured in various TV shows, including Friday Night Lights, Brothers & Sisters, Shark and Felicity and in the movie Open Range.  He appeared in an episode of the E! True Hollywood Story series, covering his time spent on The Mickey Mouse Club in 2007. He has performed numerous times on NBC's Last Call with Carson Daly as a part of the show's band.

Personal life
Lucca dated fellow Mouseketeer (and eventual Malibu Shores co-star) Keri Russell on-and-off for eight years

On July 7, 2007 Lucca married his wife Rachel. He adopted her son and they later had a daughter together.

Discography

Studio albums 
1997: So Satisfied

1997: Strong Words, Softly Spoken (re-issued 1999)

2004: Shotgun

2006: Canyon Songs (re-issued 2013 'Bonus Edition')

2008: Come Around Again

2010: Rendezvous With the Angels

2011: TFDI – When I Stop Running (collaboration with Jay Nash and Matt Duke)

2011: Solo (2 versions: 15-track CD; 11-track digital MP3)

2011: Under the Influence

2015: Tony Lucca

 2019: Ain't No Storm

Track listing:
 "Everything's Changing"
 "Come Around"
 "One Less You"
 "Frame By Frame"
 "Restless Heart"
 "Empty Handed Blues"
 "Room With A View"
 "Other Side Of The Clouds"
 "Frame By Frame – Radio Edit"

Live albums 
2005: Live & Limited V3 (CD-R-only independent release; recorded Feb 2005 in Brooklyn, NY; limited to 300 copies, signed & numbered)
2006: Live in Hollywood (digital-only independent release)
2011: Live at Jammin' Java

EPs 
2001: So Far

2002: Simply Six

2005: Songs from the DVD "Anatomy of a Blackbird" (digital-only release)
2006: Through the Cracks
2008: Close Enough
2009: TFDI (collaboration with Jay Nash and Matt Duke)
2011: TFDI II (collaboration with Jay Nash and Matt Duke)
2013: With the Whole World Watching

2014: Drawing Board

2015: Made to Shine: The Kickstarter Sessions

2016: Sessions Volume 1: Sun Studio

2016: Sessions Volume 2: Muscle Shoals

2017: TFDI – Beggars & Ballers (collaboration with Jay Nash and Matt Duke)

2017: TFDI – The Minute You Get It (collaboration with Jay Nash and Matt Duke)

Singles

Selected filmography
1991–1994  The All New Mickey Mouse Club as himself
1993  Emerald Cove as Jeff Chambers
1996  Her Last Chance as Cody
1996  Malibu Shores as Zack Morrison
1997  Take a Number as Todd
1998  Too Pure as Jared
2004  The Wayne Brady Show as himself
2007  E! True Hollywood Story: The Mickey Mouse Club as himself

DVDs 
2005: Anatomy of a Blackbird (Recorded live at Mama Juana's in Los Angeles, CA.)
2009: A Night at The Mint (Recorded live at The Mint in Los Angeles, CA.)

References

External links
 
 

Mouseketeers
American male singer-songwriters
American rock singers
American rock songwriters
21st-century American singers
20th-century American singers
21st-century American male actors
20th-century American male actors
American people of Italian descent
American people of Welsh descent
American people of French descent
American people of English descent
The Voice (franchise) contestants
1976 births
Living people
Musicians from Pontiac, Michigan
Rock Ridge Music artists
People from Waterford, Michigan
222 Records artists
Singer-songwriters from Michigan